Vanijya Mahavidyalaya, established in 1953, is a commerce college in Patna, Bihar. It is affiliated to Patna University, and offers undergraduate and postgraduate courses in commerce. It also offers a bachelor of business administration course.

Accreditation
Vanijya Mahavidyalaya was awarded A grade by the National Assessment and Accreditation Council (NAAC).

References

External links
Vanijya Mahavidyalaya

Colleges affiliated to Patna University
Universities and colleges in Patna
Educational institutions established in 1953
1953 establishments in Bihar